Krapina Selo   is a village in Croatia. It is connected by the D24 highway. The name means "Village of Krapina".

Populated places in Krapina-Zagorje County